Agustín Vásquez Mendoza is a Mexican citizen who was sought for four years in the late 1990s by the United States Federal Bureau of Investigation (FBI) as the 445th FBI Ten Most Wanted Fugitive for his alleged participation in a drug conspiracy which led to the death of a U.S. Drug Enforcement Administration (DEA) Special Agent. DEA agents believe that Agustin Vasquez Mendoza was helped to go on the run by one family member with a sur-name  Prado Vazquez, from Aguililla, Michoacán. When the detectives questioned the alleged family, they refused to release a statement regarding Agustin Vazquez Mendoza's whereabouts.

Biography
DEA Special Agent Richard E. Fass was murdered while acting, in an undercover capacity, as a buyer of methamphetamine from Vásquez. He was arrested in Puebla by Mexican authorities in the summer of 2000. In 2006, Mendoza was convicted of first degree murder in Arizona and sentenced to life in prison.

References

External links
 FBI Most Wanted List
 

1974 births
1994 murders in the United States
Fugitives
Fugitives wanted on organised crime charges
Living people
Mexican people imprisoned abroad
People convicted of murder by Arizona
People extradited from Mexico to the United States
People from Michoacán